Methylopila musalis is a Gram-negative, aerobic, facultatively methanotrophic, rod-shaped non-spore-forming and motile bacterium species from the genus Methylopila which has been isolated from the banana from the tree Musa paradisiaca var. sapientum in Ecuador.

References

Further reading

External links
Type strain of Methylopila musalis at BacDive -  the Bacterial Diversity Metadatabase

Methylocystaceae
Bacteria described in 2013